Jungle is a British hip hop drama television series created by Junior Okoli and Chas Appeti. It premiered on Amazon Prime Video on 30 September 2022.

Synopsis
The series follows the interconnected lives and struggles of strangers in a near-future, dystopian version of inner-city London, including a father trying to escape gang culture and a young mother going to great lengths to protect her children. It is a music-centric drama, told through a mixture of dialogue and rap, grime, and drill music.

Cast
 Ezra Elliott as Gogo
 RA as Slim
 Nadia A'Rubea as Jessica
 AMARIA BB as Bianca
 M24 as 6ix
 IAMDDB as Mia

Episodes

Production
On 28 August 2020, Amazon Studios announced Jungle, a grime and drill hip hop drama series.  The series was created and is executive produced by Junior Okoli and Chas Appeti, under their production company Nothing Lost. Appeti previously directed music videos for UK hip hop artists, such as Tinchy Stryder, Chip, and Giggs, and Okoli was a music manager. The two made a self-funded pilot episode, and began shopping it around to production companies, with Amazon Studios coming onboard.

The cast is made up mostly of UK rap and drill artists, including Tinie Tempah, Big Narstie, Unknown T, Jordan McCann, Jaykae, IAMDDB, Double Lz, Poundz, and M24. The series was filmed in London over eight weeks, beginning in April 2021.

Release
A teaser for the series was released on 12 August 2022. All six episodes premiered on Prime Video on 30 September 2022.

References

External links 
 

English-language television shows
Amazon Prime Video original programming
2022 British television series debuts
2020s British drama television series
2020s British music television series
Hip hop television
Grime music
Drill music